Kotputli Assembly constituency is one of constituencies of Rajasthan Legislative Assembly in the Jaipur Rural (Lok Sabha constituency).

Kotputli constituency covers all voters from parts of Kotputli tehsil, which include ILRC Kotputli including Kotputli Municipal Board, ILRC Narheda, ILRC Paniyala and ILRC Dantil.

References

See also 
 Member of the Legislative Assembly (India)

Jaipur district
Assembly constituencies of Rajasthan
|}